Volodymyr Fedorovych Demishkan (born 16 November 1949) is a Ukrainian politician, member of the Verkhovna Rada.

In 1967-1996 he made career at Bryanka transportation company. With breaks in 1996-2012 Demishkan worked as a chief of regional administration in couple of oblasts (regions) and as head of State Agency of Automobile Roads of Ukraine (Ukravtodor).

Along with heading a state road agency, in 2007-2014 Demishkan was a member of the Verkhovna Rada representing Party of Regions.

In 2010 he also served as a Governor of Vinnytsia Oblast.

References

External links
 Profile at the Official Ukraine Today portal

1949 births
Living people
People from Kirovohrad Oblast
Donetsk National Technical University alumni
Governors of Vinnytsia Oblast
Seventh convocation members of the Verkhovna Rada
Sixth convocation members of the Verkhovna Rada
Party of Regions politicians
Laureates of the Honorary Diploma of the Verkhovna Rada of Ukraine